Rafael di Tella (born 4 January 1965) is an Argentine fencer, economist and academic. He competed at the 1988 and 1992 Summer Olympics. In 1991, di Tella graduated from the Universidad de Buenos Aires with a degree in economics and in 1996 received his doctorate from Keble College, Oxford. He joined the faculty of Harvard Business School in 1997 and subsequently became the Joseph C. Wilson Professor of Business Administration.

References

External links
 

1965 births
Living people
Argentine male fencers
Argentine épée fencers
Olympic fencers of Argentina
Fencers at the 1988 Summer Olympics
Fencers at the 1992 Summer Olympics
Argentine economists
University of Buenos Aires alumni
Alumni of Keble College, Oxford
Harvard Business School faculty